Pearl Dickson (born Pearl Dixon, October 5, 1903 – October 24, 1977) was an American Memphis and country blues singer and songwriter.  She recorded four songs, "High Yellow Blues", "Twelve Pound Daddy", "Little Rock Blues", and  "Guitar Rag". Of these, only "Twelve Pound Daddy" and "Little Rock Blues" were issued. Little is known of Dickson's life outside of her short recording career.

Early life
She was born in Somerville, Tennessee, United States, in 1903.

Recording and legacy
On December 12, 1927, Dickson recorded four tracks, with backing by the guitar playing brothers, Maylon and Richard "Hacksaw" Harney.  They were recorded for Columbia Records, in Memphis, Tennessee. For unknown reasons, only one disc containing "Twelve Pound Daddy" and "Little Rock Blues" was released by Columbia in April 1928, on a 10-inch shellac phonograph record. The label billed the ensemble as Pearl Dickson accompanied by "Pet and "Can", the latter being the nicknames of her accompanists.

Some speculation exists that she was related in some way to another obscure blues figure, Tom Dickson.  Examples of both person's work have been released on the same compilation album.

According to one source, unlike her forebears' generation, who were obsessed with the idea of an afterlife, the descendants of former slaves spent more of their thinking time pondering the realities of the present, and less so on life after death.  The opening two lines of Dickson's self penned song, "Little Rock Blues" were "I started to heaven, but I changed my mind / But I'm going to Little Rock, where I can have a better time". Open to interpretation, Dickson nevertheless indicates that a journey to presumably Little Rock, Arkansas, is a better option than piety, or even suicide. Her lyrics were used as an example in another published text, to illustrate changes in inflection and the tense and modification of verbs within blues lyrics. Stefan Grossman used "Little Rock Blues" as the basis for a track he arranged in 1966, which he called "Little Rock Blues Number Two".  Another publication quoted the full lyrics for both "Little Rock Blues" and "Twelve Pound Daddy".

Death
She died in Memphis, Tennessee, in 1977, aged 74.

Discography

Singles

Selected compilation albums

References

External links
Discogs.com listing
"Little Rock Blues" @ YouTube
"Twelve Pound Daddy" @ YouTube

1903 births
1977 deaths
People from Somerville, Tennessee
Songwriters from Tennessee
American blues singers
20th-century African-American women singers
20th-century American women singers
American women songwriters
Country blues musicians
Memphis blues musicians
Columbia Records artists
20th-century American singers
African-American songwriters